Philip Rea may refer to:
 Philip A. Rea, British biochemist, science writer and educator
 Philip Rea, 2nd Baron Rea, British peer, politician and merchant banker